This is a list of the French singles & airplay chart reviews number-ones of 1961.

Number-ones by week

Singles chart

See also
1961 in music
List of number-one hits (France)

References

1961 in France
1961 record charts
Lists of number-one songs in France